Goniochaeta is a genus of bristle flies in the family Tachinidae.

Species
Goniochaeta fuscibasis Aldrich, 1926
Goniochaeta plagioides Townsend, 1891

References

Dexiinae
Tachinidae genera
Diptera of North America
Taxa named by Charles Henry Tyler Townsend